Rhederbrug is a hamlet near Bellingwolde in the municipality of Westerwolde in the Netherlands. The hamlet has a population of 240.

The hamlet was first mentioned in 1983 as Rhederbrug, and means bridge to Rhede in Germany. The bridge was built around 1917. Rhederbrug is considered part of Bellingwolde.

References

External links 
 

Germany–Netherlands border crossings
Populated places in Groningen (province)
Westerwolde (municipality)